Henry Allen "Harry" Wedgwood (4 April 1799 - 17 October 1885) was an English barrister.

Wedgwood was the third child and second son of Josiah Wedgwood II and his wife Elizabeth Allen.  He was a grandson of the illustrious potter Josiah Wedgwood and a brother-in-law of the naturalist Charles Darwin.

He married Jessie Wedgwood on 14 September 1830 at Abergavenny. Jessie was his double first cousin, the daughter of John Wedgwood (1766–1844) and his wife Louisa Jane Allen.  Henry and Jessie had six children: Louisa Frances (later Kempson) b.1834,  Caroline Elizabeth b.1836, John Darwin b.1840, Anne Jane b.1841, Arthur b.1843 and Rowland Henry b.1847.

He authored the children's book The Bird Talisman: An Eastern Tale.  Some editions were illustrated by his cousin twice removed Gwen Raverat.

References

External links 
 https://web.archive.org/web/20060208222801/http://darwin.lib.cam.ac.uk/perl/nav?class=name.

1799 births
1885 deaths
Darwin–Wedgwood family
English barristers
People from Maer, Staffordshire
19th-century English lawyers